Tropidotrochus is a genus of sea snails, marine gastropod mollusks in the family Calliostomatidae within the superfamily Trochoidea, the top snails, turban snails and their allies.

Species
 Calliostoma (Tropidotrochus) jayae Parodiz 1977

References

External links
 To World Register of Marine Species

Calliostomatidae
Monotypic gastropod genera